Tadeusz Bafia (born 18 September 1964) is a Polish skier. He competed in the Nordic combined event at the 1988 Winter Olympics.

References

External links
 

1964 births
Living people
Polish male Nordic combined skiers
Olympic Nordic combined skiers of Poland
Nordic combined skiers at the 1988 Winter Olympics
People from Nowy Targ
Sportspeople from Lesser Poland Voivodeship
20th-century Polish people